This is a discography of M. M. Keeravani, who is an Indian film composer, record producer and playback singer best known for his works in Telugu, Hindi, Tamil, Kannada, and Malayalam cinema. His latest release PellisandaD was his 188th film as a composer (not counting the dubbed films).

Composer

1990s

2000s

2010s

2020s

Singer

Notes:
 The films are listed in order that the music released, regardless of the dates the film released.
 The year next to the title of the affected films indicates the release year of the either dubbed or remade version in the named language later than the original version.
 • indicates original language release. Indicates simultaneous makes, if featuring in more languages.
 ♦ indicates a remade version, the remaining ones being dubbed versions.

Lyricist 
This is a listing of the songs and tracks Keeravani has contributed as a lyricist to various feature films.

References

External links

Discographies of Indian artists